Dioxeuta is a genus of aleocharine rove beetle in the tribe Termitopaediini.

Species include:
Dioxeuta negaricus
Dioxeuta sinensis
Dioxeuta yunnanensis

References

Aleocharinae
Aleocharinae genera